Chekdirme or Çekdirme is a Turkmen traditional food that is cooked simultaneously with rice, meat (usually mutton or lamb), tomato paste or tomato and onions with oil, water and add-ons such as salt, turmeric and pepper.

This dish is prepared in a cast-iron pot called a "Qazan". Initially small pieces of meat are fried in oil, then onions are added and then shredded roast onions, tomatoes or tomato paste. The meat is boiled, and rice is added. The water level should be a knuckle above the rice, then the heat is decreased until the rice has cooked.

See also

 List of lamb dishes

References

Ethnic Turkmen culture
Rice dishes
Turkmenistan cuisine
Lamb dishes